Naya Sadak ko Geet is a collection of short stories by Ramesh Bikal. It was published on 1961 by Sajha Publications. It won the Madan Puraskar in the same year. It is Bikal's second book.

Synopsis 
The stories are set in New Road, a financial hub and high street in Kathmandu. The main protagonist of the book is a blind man named Jeevan Baral. The stories in the book depicts the exploitation and discrimination faced by Jeevan. Written in the context of the end of the Rana period and the renaissance of democracy in Nepal, the story inside reveals many aspects of the social life of the time. This stories in the book tell a lot about the psychology and socio-economic condition of people of different classes and levels at that time.

Theme 
Bikal's stories are a realistic representation of the exploitation, oppression, deceit, hypocrisy, deception, inhumane treatment by the upper classes of the society and their cronies and the life of the lower class people who are forced to endure such activities and behaviors. Bikal's stories, influenced by Marxist thought, seem to have an artistic progressive tone, not a slogan. He exposes the selfish and vile tendencies of the people through the stories o the book.

Awards 
The book won the prestigious Madan Puraskar for the year 2018 BS (1961). It is the first short story collection to win the Madan Puraskar.

Adaptation 
The book was adapted into a play by Yubraj Ghimire in 2019 and performed in Shilpee theatre.

See also 

 Narendra Dai
 Shirishko Phool
 Mann

References 

1961 short story collections
20th-century Nepalese books
Nepalese books
Nepalese short story collections
Madan Puraskar-winning works
Nepali-language books
Nepali short story collections